Reuben Davis may refer to:

 Reuben Davis (American football) (born 1965), American football player
 Reuben Davis (representative) (1813–1890), United States representative

See also
 Reuben Davis House, Aberdeen, Mississippi
 Reuben Davies or Reuben Brydydd y Coed (1808–1833), Welsh poet
 Reuben David (1912–1989), founder of the Ahmedabad Zoo
 David Reuben (disambiguation)